The Ford GTB, commonly called the Burma Jeep, was a 1-ton 4x4 truck produced during WWII by Ford and was used primarily by the United States military, primarily the US Navy and Marine Corps. The GTB was used primarily in the Pacific Theater during World War II, with many being used on the "Burma Road".

GTBs remained in service after WW II. Some were used during the Korean War (1950-1953). The last units were retired from service as late as 1967.

The GTB's Ordnance Standard nomenclature number was G-622.

Variants
Ford produced over 15,000 of these low silhouette, short, and maneuverable GTB's in five models, with all except the GTBS having dual rear wheels:

 GTB truck, Cargo, the basic version with a troop/cargo carrying bed equipped with side mounted folding bench seats,
 GTBA truck, (US Navy) All navy versions were produced in "Ocean Grey"
 GTBB truck, Wrecker, (Rare, only 50 produced)
 GTBS truck, Bomb Service with crane (US Navy)
 GTBC truck, Bomb Service with crane (USN, improved)

Operators
 
 Military of the United States
 United States Navy
 United States Marine Corps

Notes

General references
 TM 10-1435 Maintenance Manual for Ford GTB (G622) 1 1⁄2-ton 4×4 truck , August 20, 1942 edition. 181 pages.
 TM 10-1434 Illustrated Parts for Ford 1 1⁄2-ton 4×4 truck , July 1942

See also
 Jeffery Quad - a similar but much older vehicle

External links
 Burma Jeep from the Wright Museum of WWII Wolfeboro NH
 Burma Jeep Navy Bomb Service Truck from the Wright Museum of WWII
 Marshallmuseum - Liberty Park - Oorlogsmuseum Overloon, The Netherlands.

World War II vehicles of the United States
Military trucks of the United States
Motor vehicles manufactured in the United States
Military light utility vehicles
Military vehicles introduced from 1940 to 1944